Ivan Georgiev Stoyanov (20 January 1949 – 10 December 2017) was a Bulgarian footballer who played as a midfielder for Bulgaria in the 1974 FIFA World Cup. He also played for Spartak Sofia and Levski Sofia.

Death
His death was announced on December 10, 2017, aged 68.

Honours
Spartak Sofia
Bulgarian Cup: 1967–68

Levski Sofia
Bulgarian A Group (3): 1969–70, 1973–74, 1976–77
Bulgarian Cup (4): 1969–70, 1970–71, 1975–76, 1976–77

References

External links

Profile at levskisofia.info

1949 births
2017 deaths
Bulgarian footballers
Bulgaria international footballers
Association football midfielders
PFC Levski Sofia players
1974 FIFA World Cup players
First Professional Football League (Bulgaria) players
Footballers from Sofia